David Robert McLintock (17 November 1930 – 16 October 2003) was a British academic and translator. A pre-eminent scholar of Old High German language and literature, who taught in Oxford and London, he later became a prize-winning translator, noted for helping to establish the reputation of the Austrian writer Thomas Bernhard in the English-speaking world.

Life
He was born in Barnsley, Yorkshire. He attended Scarborough High School for Boys and won a scholarship to study at Queen's College, Oxford, gaining a First in French and German in 1952. He then obtained a Diploma in Comparative Philology under Leonard Palmer and C.L. Wrenn; his chosen languages were Greek and Gothic. He went on to study in Münster with Jost Trier, and in Munich under Wilhelm Wissmann.

Returning to Oxford, he became a university lecturer in Germanic philology and mediaeval German literature, attached first to Mansfield College and then to the newly founded Wolfson College.

One of his Oxford pupils was John le Carré and McLintock "liked to think that George Smiley's affectionate references to German studies owed something to his tutorials". In A Perfect Spy, le Carré describes his protagonist Pym's dedication to McLintock's disciplines:

By the end of his first term he was an enthusiastic student of Middle and Old High German. By the end of his second he could recite the Hildebrandslied and intone Bishop Ulfila's Gothic translation of the Bible in his college bar to the delight of his modest court. By the middle of his third he was romping in the Parnassian fields of comparative and putative philology.

In 1967 he moved to London to become Reader in German at Royal Holloway College in the department headed by Ralph Tymms.

McLintock was regarded as "one of the foremost comparative Germanic philologists of his generation in Britain" and his major scholarly achievement was to complete the revision of J. Knight Bostock's A Handbook of Old High German Literature,  which he undertook after the death of his colleague Kenneth King. The book remains "the most comprehensive guide to the field in any language". He was also the author of many scholarly articles on early German language and literature, with notable contributions on the Nibelungenlied and the Hildebrandslied, as well as several articles on Old High German texts in the standard reference work the Verfasserlexikon des deutschen Mittelalters.

In 1983, the University of London recognized his contribution to scholarship by awarding him the degree of Doctor of Letters (D.Lit).

In 1982, at the age of 51, he took early retirement from university life and started afresh as a freelance translator. While he translated a number of important non-literary texts, such as Christian Meier's The Greek Discovery of Politics and Sigmund Freud's Civilisation and its Discontents, his reputation as a translator rests largely on the success of his literary translations. in 1986 he received the Austrian State Prize for Literary Translation, and he twice won the Schlegel-Tieck Prize — in 1990 for Heinrich Böll's Women in a River Landscape and in 1996 for Thomas Bernhard's Extinction and Christian Meier's Caesar. He translated many of Bernhard's works and is credited with introducing this controversial author to English readers:

It was only when David McLintock took on the translations of his later works, starting with his memoir Gathering Evidence to his last work Extinction, that Bernhard finds his voice in the English language.

His translations of Bernhard include Concrete, Woodcutters, Wittgenstein's Nephew, Extinction and the multi-volume autobiography Gathering Evidence.

He died in 2003, at the age of 72.

The University of Oxford offers three prizes and grants in the area of Germanic Philology in his memory.

Publications

Books

Articles (selective)

Translations

Notes

References
 
 
 
 
 
 

1930 births
2003 deaths
People from Barnsley
Alumni of The Queen's College, Oxford
Academics of the University of Oxford
Academics of Royal Holloway, University of London
Germanists
Historical linguists
20th-century British translators
21st-century British translators
German–English translators
People educated at Scarborough High School for Boys